Les Éclairs (The Lightning Flashes)  is an opera in four acts to a libretto by Jean Echenoz with music by Philippe Hersant. It was premiered at the Opéra-Comique in Paris on 2 November 2021.

Based on a novel in verse by Echenoz, the opera is a fantasised biography of the inventor Nikola Tesla as the main character, Gregor. It depicts his arrival in America in 1884, a stormy relationship with Thomas Edison, Gregor's adoption by the (fictional) entrepreneur Parker and the support he receives from the (also fictional) philanthropist couple Ethel and Norman (the former of whom falls in love with Gregor). He is also supported by the journalist Betty. As with the real-life Tesla, Gregor becomes progressively obsessed with impractical projects and imagined extra-terrestrial contacts.

Roles

References

Operas
2021 operas
French-language operas
Operas based on real people
Operas based on novels
Operas set in the United States